Gjel Glacier is a glacier,  long, flowing north between the steep cliffs of the Luncke Range and Mefjell Mountain, in the Sør Rondane Mountains of Antarctica. It was mapped by Norwegian cartographers in 1957 from air photos taken by U.S. Navy Operation Highjump, 1946–47, and named Gjelbreen (the ravine glacier).

See also
 List of glaciers in the Antarctic
 Glaciology

References

Glaciers of Queen Maud Land
Princess Ragnhild Coast